That Reminds Me is a series of programmes broadcast on BBC Radio 4 where someone (usually) connected with comedy talks about their life for thirty minutes in front of a live audience. The series has been running since 1999, and is produced by Claire Jones.

Episode list

Series 1
S01 E01 - Barry Cryer (25 March 1999)
S01 E02 - Barry Took (1 April 1999)
S01 E03 - Nicholas Parsons (8 April 1999)
S01 E04 - Peter Jones (15 April 1999)
S01 E05 - Bill Pertwee (22 April 1999)
S01 E06 - Ned Sherrin (29 April 1999)

Series 2
S02 E01 - Roy Hudd (26 September 2000)
S02 E02 - Maureen Lipman (3 October 2000)
S02 E03 - Humphrey Lyttelton (10 October 2000)
S02 E04 - Sir Clement Freud (17 October 2000)
S02 E05 - Victor Spinetti (24 October 2000)
S02 E06 - Dora Bryan (31 October 2000)

Series 3
S03 E01 - George Melly (20 November 2001)
S03 E02 - John Fortune (27 November 2001)
S03 E03 - Sheila Steafel (4 December 2001)
S03 E04 - Jack Douglas (11 December 2001)
S03 E05 - Warren Mitchell (18 December 2001)
S03 E06 - John Inman (25 December 2001)

Series 4
S04 E01 - Ludovic Kennedy (1 October 2002)
S04 E02 - Andrew Sachs (8 October 2002)
S04 E03 - Melvyn Hayes (15 October 2002)
S04 E04 - Pam Ayres (22 October 2002)
S04 E05 - Peter Sallis (29 October 2002)
S04 E06 - John Mortimer (5 November 2002)

Series 5
S05 E01 - Keith Barron (19 August 2003)
S05 E02 - Nerys Hughes (26 August 2003)
S05 E03 - Dudley Sutton (2 September 2003)
S05 E04 - Charles Collingwood (9 September 2003)
S05 E05 - Liz Fraser (16 September 2003)
S05 E06 - Richard Griffiths (20 September 2003)

External links 
 

BBC Radio 4 programmes